Brandon Wakeham (born 11 January 1999) is a Fiji international rugby league footballer who plays as a  or  for Wests Tigers in the NRL.

He previously played for the Canterbury-Bankstown Bulldogs in the NRL.

Background
Wakeham was born in Kogarah, New South Wales, Australia. He is of Fijian and Lebanese descent. 

He played his junior rugby league for Chester Hill Hornets.

Playing career

2019
He made his international debut for Fiji in their 56-14 victory vs Lebanon in the 2019 Pacific Test, where he scored 20 points in the match. 

In round 15 of the 2019 NRL season, Wakeham made his NRL debut for the Canterbury-Bankstown Bulldogs off the interchange bench in his sides 14-12 win over the Cronulla-Sutherland Sharks. Wakeham played majority of the game at five-eighth after Kieran Foran left the field in the early stages due to injury.

2020
Wakeham played a total of 16 appearances for Canterbury in the 2020 NRL season.  The club finished in 15th place on the table, only avoiding the Wooden Spoon by for and against.

2021
In round 7 of the 2021 NRL season, Wakeham became the first ever 18th man to take the field after Canterbury-Bankstown suffered a concussion which invoked the new 18th man rule which had been brought in by the NRL.

Wakeham made a total of eight appearances for Canterbury in the 2021 NRL season as the club finished last and claimed the Wooden Spoon.

2022
On 1 June, Wakeham was suspended for four matches after being found guilty of eye gouging St. George Illawarra's Tyrell Sloan during a NSW Cup game at Belmore Sports Ground. Wakeham played a total of eight games for the club in the 2022 NRL season.
Wakeham captained Canterbury's NSW Cup team in their grand final loss to Penrith at the Western Sydney Stadium.

2023
On 24 January, Wakeham signed a one-year deal to join the Wests Tigers ahead of the 2023 NRL season.

Controversy
On 25 June 2021, Wakeham was one of three Canterbury players who were ordered to self-isolate after attending a Covid-19 exposure site in Sydney's Eastern Suburbs.  The NRL had ordered players of all 16 teams a week earlier not to attend any restaurants, clubs or bars in the Waverley Local Government area.

References

External links
Canterbury-Bankstown Bulldogs profile
Fiji profile

1999 births
Living people
Australian rugby league players
Australian people of Fijian descent
Australian people of Lebanese descent
Fiji national rugby league team players
Canterbury-Bankstown Bulldogs players
Wests Tigers players
Rugby league halfbacks
Rugby league players from Sydney
Western Suburbs Magpies NSW Cup players